Klaus Lage (born 16 June 1950) is a German musician from Soltau, Lower Saxony. He is known for his 1984 single "1000 und 1 Nacht (Zoom!)".

Discography
 Klaus Lage (1980)
 Positiv (1982)
 Stadtstreicher (1983)
 Schweißperlen (1984)
 Heiße Spuren (1985)
 Mit meinen Augen - Live (1986)
 Amtlich (1987)
 Rauhe Bilder (1989)
 Single Hit Collection 1982 - 1990 (1990)
 Lieben & Lügen (1991)
 Ein Lachen in Reserve (1992)
 Katz & Maus (1994)
 Live zu zweit (1999)
 Mensch bleiben (2000)
 Die Welt ist schön (2003)
 Zug um Zug (2007)

Klaus Lage has a long history of singing bluesy German hits.

External links
Official web site

1950 births
Living people
German male musicians
German male singers